The ARIA Music Award for Highest Selling Single was an award presented at the annual ARIA Music Awards. It was presented from 1987 through to 2011.

Kylie Minogue holds the record for the most wins, at three (1988, 1989 and 2002).

Winners and nominees
In the following table, the winner is highlighted in a separate colour, and in boldface; the nominees are those that are not highlighted or in boldface.

Notes

References

External links

 

 
Highest Selling Single